Matveyevo is a rural locality (a settlement) in Nyuksenskoye Rural Settlement, Nyuksensky District, Vologda Oblast, Russia. The population was 482 as of 2002. There are 8 streets.

Geography 
Matveyevo is located 40 km northeast of Nyuksenitsa (the district's administrative centre) by road. Ozerki is the nearest rural locality.

References 

Rural localities in Nyuksensky District